Putsonderwater (formerly Putzonderwater) is an abandoned settlement in !Kheis Local Municipality in the Northern Cape province of South Africa. It is located on the R383 road from Kenhardt to Marydale. Translated from Afrikaans, the name means "well without water".

In South Africa, the term Putsonderwater is used to indicate a far-off place, similarly to Timbuktu or Brigadoon.

One story told regarding the settlement's name goes as follows: Farmers who pulled out of the Cape Colony (Western Cape Province today) with their ox wagons (wagons pulled by oxen) in 1838 because they no longer wanted to stay there under the British government, had later arrived in the Northern Cape at the place known today as “Putsonderwater”. As they stayed over there, it started to rain quite a lot, almost like in a “cloud break.” The water started to flow and rose higher and higher where the wagons stood until it ran through just under the wagons.

The practice in those years was to lubricate the wooden wheels and axles of the wagons with tar because it was the only lubricant they had. The tar helped the wheels to run smoothly around the axles and could also reduce wear and tear.

The tar was kept in a bucket with a handle hanging outside the wagons because it was always very dirty of the tar and could not be transported inside the wagons. The bucket was known as a “tar puts” (teerputs in Afrikaans) and later hung under the water that ran under the wagons, and so the farmers then decided that the place's name would be "Puts Onder Water" (“Puts Under Water”). This story was told by our Afrikaans teacher, Mr Gert Behr, to our standard 5 class (grade 7) in 1964 at the Jagersfontein High School in the Free State Province, South Africa. Fanie Brink, South Africa.

Another version has it: Back in the dim and distant past, this little dorp was called Klippan. Then an old coloured man called David Ockhuis who dug a well in the 1880s but was loath to share the water with passers-by.

So whenever a trekboer asked him if they could have a drink to slake their thirst in this dry and dusty land the man replied "Ja meneer, ek het 'n put, maar dis 'n put sonder water." ("Yes sir, I have a well, but it's a well without water.")

According to this article: "The name stuck and the land was later split into two. The one farm was called Putzonderwater (with the Dutch "z") and the other Middelka".

Factoids:
 The railway siding was named Putsonderwater (with the Afrikaans "s") and the town was apparently first called Krombegin (Skewed Beginning).
 Bartho Smit wrote the play Putsonderwater in 1962, but it could not be performed in South Africa because of its political message. In 1978 it won the Hertzog Prize for Literature.
 Putzonderwater once won certificates for being the neatest railway station in South Africa. Now, there are only four families left.

References

Populated places in the !Kheis Local Municipality